The 2018 Internationaux de Tennis de Vendée was a professional tennis tournament played on hard courts. It was the sixth edition of the tournament which was part of the 2018 ATP Challenger Tour. It took place in Mouilleron-le-Captif, France between 5 and 11 November 2018.

Singles main-draw entrants

Seeds

 1 Rankings are as of 29 October 2018.

Other entrants
The following players received wildcards into the singles main draw:
  Mathias Bourgue
  Enzo Couacaud
  Tom Jomby
  Matteo Martineau

The following players received entry into the singles main draw as special exempts:
  Maxime Janvier
  Gleb Sakharov

The following players received entry from the qualifying draw:
  Zizou Bergs
  Joris De Loore
  Laurynas Grigelis
  Alexandre Müller

The following player received entry as a lucky loser:
  Elliot Benchetrit

Champions

Singles

 Elias Ymer def.  Yannick Maden 6–3, 7–6(7–5).

Doubles

 Sander Gillé /  Joran Vliegen def.  Romain Arneodo /  Quentin Halys 6–3, 4–6, [10–2].

External links
Official Website

2018 ATP Challenger Tour
2018